SV Huizen is an association football club from Huizen, Netherlands.

History
The club became Dutch national amateur champions in 1974 and in 2003. In 2001, Huizen won the Regional Cup of the now defunct Central soccer district. In 2016 it Huizen promoted to the Derde Divisie. In 2017 it relegated back to the Hoofdklasse. In 2018 it relegated once again, to the Eerste Klasse. In 2022, Huizen promoted to the Vierde Divisie, after winning an Eerste Klasse section championship.

References

External links 
 Official site

Football clubs in the Netherlands
1927 establishments in the Netherlands
Association football clubs established in 1927
Football clubs in Huizen